Oilstone may refer to
 Sharpening stone
 USAF/CIA operation OILSTONE
 Oil shale